Bear Branch may refer to:

Inhabited places in the United States
Bear Branch, Indiana, an unincorporated community in Ohio County
Bear Branch, Kentucky, a branch of Big Creek river in Leslie County
Bear Branch, Missouri, an unincorporated community

Bodies of water in the United States
Bear Branch (Bear Creek tributary), a stream in Missouri
Bear Branch (Black River tributary), a stream in Missouri
Bear Branch (Burris Fork tributary), a stream in Missouri
Bear Branch (South Fork Blackwater River tributary), a stream in Missouri
Bear Branch (Spencer Creek tributary), a stream in Missouri

Other uses
Bear Branch Nature Center, in Carroll County, Maryland, United States

See also
Bear Creek (disambiguation)